Haj Fadel Government was a government formed during the Occupation of Zor in the eastern region of Syria and based in Deir al-Zour`s city after the departure of the Ottomans in 1918, headed by Haj Fadel Al-Aboud and it was called his name.

Haj Fadel Aboud 

Fadel Aboud Hassan was born in Deir al-Zour in 1872, and his leadership traits had been evident since his early childhood, He was successful in leadership after he received it, although he did not receive an education, He also had a prominent social status in the city of Deir al-Zour, which enabled him to take over the leadership, inherited this status from his father Aboud Hassan, Haj Fadel worked in trade and had extensive commercial relations with the Turkish merchants and Halbians and with his cousins Najjar and Tayfur in the city of Hama.

Haj Fadel Al-Aboud was arrested several times for his support of national issues and revolutions, He was sentenced to exile to the city of Jisr al-Shughour after he was accused of preparing a popular revolt against French colonialism in protest against the military campaign by the French army against the Bukhabur tribes that refused to pay taxes to the French colonizer. As well as insulting Wali Deir al-Zour Khalil Isaac, who was cooperating with the French.

He protested the decision of the French High Commissioner Maurice Paul Sarrail No. 49 S / 5 in August 1925, that ordered the exile of his cousin Ayyash Al-Haj with all his family members to the city of Jableh for their struggle against French colonialism, which exposed him to security persecution and repeated detention by the French military authorities.

Haj Fadel Al-Aboud represented the Euphrates region at the Syrian National Congress held in late June 1919, which proclaimed on 8 March 1920, the independence of Syria and establishment of the Syrian Arab Kingdom and inauguration of Faisal bin Sharif Hussein as its king. Fadel Al-Aboud participated in the inauguration ceremony of Faisal King of Iraq on 23 August 1921, and was supporting to his inauguration.

Haj Fadel Al-Aboud died in 1936 in the city of Deir al-Zour and was buried there.

Formation of the first government 

Trouble broke out in the city of Deir al-Zour after the Ottomans left on 6 November 1918, where people began looting and stealing from each other across the area, so it was necessary to have a strong authority for protecting the city and its people and that led Al-Hassan who was the mayor to form his first government in the city and asking all tribal leaders in the villages and surrounding districts to support him and pledge allegiance to him. One of the priorities of this government was to maintain security and run the city's affairs. This government later known as the "government of Haj Fadel."

The government continued until the arrival of Sharif Nasser, the cousin of Prince Faisal Bin Al-Hussein, on 1 December 1918, and Mari Basha Al-Mallah on 7 December 1918.

Formation of the second government 
After the Battle of Maysalun on 24 July 1920 and occupation of Damascus by French forces, The city of Deir Ezzor was in a state of chaos and insecurity, which prompted Al-Hassan to form his second government, Which has done excellent services in protecting the city and maintaining the security of its people despite its limited capabilities.

This government continued its work until 23 November 1920, when it was dissolved by a decision of the French occupation authorities.

Achievements of Haj Fadel government 
The most significant achievements of the government of Haj Fadel I and II:
 Protecting symptoms, selves, property, and achieving security in the area, where no one reported that there was a case of murder or theft at that time despite its short duration.
 Preventing reprisals or settling personal issues after the departure of the Ottoman and then Arab forces.
 Commitment to pay the salaries of government employees.
 Continued public services in the city.

Armenian genocide

When the Ottoman government persecuted the Armenian people and forced them to march out to the Syrian city of Deir al-Zour and the surrounding desert, without any facilities and supplies that would have been necessary to sustain the life of hundreds of thousands of Armenian deportees during and after their forced march to the Syrian desert.

Al-Hassan, who was the mayor of Deir al-Zour, provided them with food and housing. Means of livelihood and security, The Armenians returned the favor to Al-Hassan when the French colonialism sentenced him to death in Aleppo, where they supported and defended him, which led the French to abolish the death penalty and only exile him to Jisr al-Shughur.

See also

 Fadel Al-Aboud
 Ayyash Al-Haj
 The epic of Ain Albu Gomaa
 Syria
 Deir al-Zour
 Deir ez-Zor suspension bridge
 Deir ez-Zor Camps
 Al-Baggara
 Syrian National Congress

References 

1918 in Ottoman Syria
Deir ez-Zor
France–Syria relations
French Mandate for Syria and the Lebanon